Morgan Gardner Bulkeley (December 26, 1837 – November 6, 1922) was an American politician, businessman, and sports executive.  A Republican, he served in the American Civil War, and became a Hartford bank president before becoming the third president of the Aetna Life Insurance Company, a post he held for 43 years.  He was elected to the National Baseball Hall of Fame in recognition of his role as the first president of the National League.  Bulkeley served on the Hartford City Council and was a four-term mayor of Hartford.  He later served as the 54th Governor of Connecticut for two terms and as a United States Senator.

Early life, career and war
Bulkeley was born in East Haddam, Connecticut, to an old local family. His father, State Senator Eliphalet Adams Bulkeley, was a descendant of the Reverend Peter Bulkeley, eight generations removed. Peter Bulkeley was a founder of Concord, Massachusetts and sailed to North America from England on the ship Susan & Ellen in May 1635. Morgan Bulkeley's mother, Lydia Smith (Morgan), descended from passengers of the Mayflower more than 200 years prior.

He was educated at Bacon Academy in Colchester. In 1846, the Bulkeley family moved to Hartford, Connecticut. Morgan's father, Eliphalet Adams Bulkeley, was prominent in the Connecticut Republican Party and helped found the Aetna Life Insurance Company, becoming its first president in 1853. He was also a descendant of the third President of Harvard University, Charles Chauncy. Morgan Bulkeley attended Hartford Public High School and, at age 14, started working at the Aetna sweeping floors for a dollar a day along with his brother, Charles.

Bulkeley left Hartford to work for his uncle's company, H. P. Morgan & Company, in Brooklyn, New York. He was an errand boy in Brooklyn in 1852 and later worked as a salesman.

During the Civil War, Bulkeley served as a private with the 13th New York Volunteer Heavy Artillery. He served from May 28, 1862 until September 28, 1862. He served under General George B. McClellan in the Peninsula Campaign and later under General Joseph K. Mansfield. His brother, Captain Charles E. Bulkeley, was killed during the war. He became a companion of the Military Order of the Loyal Legion of the United States by right of inheritance from his brother, who would have been eligible for membership had he lived.

After the Civil War, Bulkeley returned to Morgan & Company. When his father died in 1872, Bulkeley returned to Hartford and helped form the United States Bank of Hartford, becoming its first president. He later served on Aetna's board of directors.

Baseball
After returning to Hartford in the early days of professional baseball, Bulkeley formed the Hartford Dark Blues of the National Association of Professional Base Ball Players in 1874.  In 1875, the team featured Hall of Fame pitcher Candy Cummings and player-manager Bob "Death to Flying Things" Ferguson. In 1876, the NAPBBP was replaced by the National League.  Hartford was one of the charter members and Bulkeley was named the league's first president.  In his only season as president, he targeted illegal gambling, drinking and fan rowdiness. After the season, he was replaced as president by William Hulbert.  Bulkeley was elected to the National Baseball Hall of Fame and Museum in 1937, 15 years after his death. He was also one of the seven members of the Mills Commission formed by Albert Spalding, the group that gave credence to the myth that Abner Doubleday invented baseball.

Politics
Bulkeley's short career as a baseball executive coincided with the beginning of his political career.  From 1874 to 1876, he served on the Hartford Common Council and the Board of Aldermen.  When Thomas O. Enders resigned Aetna's presidency due to ill health in 1879, Bulkeley became the company's third president.  In 1880, Bulkeley ran for both mayor of Hartford and ran as the Republican nominee for lieutenant governor of Connecticut. He lost the lieutenant gubernatorial race but won the mayoral race and was Hartford's mayor from 1880 to 1888. As mayor he became known for his flamboyant generosity; for instance, arranging steamboat trips on the Connecticut River for underprivileged children, using his own money. While mayor of Hartford, on February 11, 1885, Bulkeley married Fannie Briggs Houghton in San Francisco, California. They had two sons and a daughter.

In 1882, Bulkeley was the Republican nominee for governor of Connecticut.

In 1888, Bulkeley again ran for governor. In the election, Luzon B. Morris accumulated more votes than Bulkeley but neither had the required 50%.  In accordance with the rules of the time, the General Assembly decided the winner and the largely Republican body chose Bulkeley.  Although he did not run in 1890, the vote was so close and fell into such disarray due to ballot irregularities in Bridgeport that officials did not certify the results, and the Connecticut House of Representatives and Senate, each led by opposing parties, could not agree on a legal successor. When Bulkeley refused to recognize the Democratic candidate as the victor, the Democratic state comptroller changed the lock on an anteroom that led from the governor's office to the Statehouse. When Bulkeley found the door locked the next morning, he broke in with a crowbar, earning the nickname the "Crow-Bar Governor". When the legislature refused to appropriate money for state government operations because of the deadlock, Bulkeley, who also happened to be president of Aetna Life Insurance Co., had his company pick up the state's bills until the next election.  Bulkeley remained in office two more years, and the state Supreme Court unanimously held that he had been the lawful governor for the disputed period of time.

Bulkeley later served one term in the U.S. Senate from 1905 to 1911, as part of the "Millionaires' Senate" of 1906, so named for the wealth of its members.

Death and legacy
Morgan Bulkeley died in Hartford at age 84 and was interred at Cedar Hill Cemetery.   At the time of his death, Bulkeley had been the president of Aetna for 43 years and had increased its assets from $25.7 million to $207 million and from 29 to 1,500 employees. Under his guidance, Aetna had been transformed from a life insurance company into a company that offered accident, health, automobile, workers compensation, and group insurance. He was succeeded by his nephew, Morgan B. Brainard, who led Aetna for the following 35 years.

Bulkeley's widow, Fannie, died on June 22, 1938.

Memberships
He was a member of the Freemasons, Society of the Cincinnati, Grand Army of the Republic, Sons of the Revolution, Sons of the American Revolution, Society of Colonial Wars and the Military Order of Foreign Wars.  In 1894 he was elected as a Hereditary Companion of the Massachusetts Commandery of the Military Order of the Loyal Legion of the United States by right of inheritance from his brother, Captain Charles E. Bulkeley, was killed during the Civil War.

Legacy
The Hartford Bridge over the Connecticut River was renamed the Bulkeley Bridge in his honor in 1922 after his death. Morgan G. Bulkeley High School, which opened in Hartford in 1926, was also named for him. In 1928, Clarkin Field in Hartford was renamed Morgan G. Bulkeley Stadium in his honor.

References

Further reading

External links

1837 births
1922 deaths
19th-century American businesspeople
20th-century American businesspeople
Aetna employees
American bank presidents
American people of English descent
American people of Welsh descent
Baseball executives
Burials at Cedar Hill Cemetery (Hartford, Connecticut)
Businesspeople from Hartford, Connecticut
Republican Party governors of Connecticut
Mayors of Hartford, Connecticut
Military personnel from Connecticut
National Baseball Hall of Fame inductees
National League presidents
People from East Haddam, Connecticut
People of Connecticut in the American Civil War
Republican Party United States senators from Connecticut
Union Army soldiers
Bacon Academy alumni